Bruzzese is an Italian surname. Notable people with the surname include:

Sébastien Bruzzese (born 1989), Belgian footballer
Carmelo Bruzzese (born 1949), Italian-Canadian mobster

Italian-language surnames